St. Louis Motion Picture Company was a film production company during the silent film era. It advertised its debut films A Gypsy's Love and Algernon's Busy Day in 1912. In 1913 the company established itself in Santa Paula, California.

St. Louis lawyer Oscar E. Goebel was the firm's initial president and treasurer. In 1913, the company bought Melie's Motion Picture Studio.

Vaudevillian Glen Cavender began his film career with the company. Cinematographer John F. Seitz followed Flying A executive Gilbert P. Hamilton to the company.

In 1914, the company was contracted by the St. Louis Equal Suffrage League to produce a photoplay advancing the suffragist cause.

Cinematographer Willis Robards also worked for the company.

Filmography
A Gypsy's Love (1912)
Algernon's Busy Day (1912)
Peril of the Plains (1912)
Colonel Custard's Last Stand (1914)

References

Film production companies of the United States
1912 establishments in Missouri
American companies established in 1912
Mass media companies established in 1912